Squalo was the name of at least three ships of the Italian Navy and may refer to:

 , a  launched in 1906 and discarded in 1918.
 , a  launched in 1930 and laid up in 1948.
 , an  built in the United States for Italy. She was launched in 1955 as MSO-518 and transferred to Italy as Squalo after completion in 1957. Decommissioned in 2000. 

Italian Navy ship names